Lee Roy Reams (born August 23, 1942) is an American musical theatre actor, singer, dancer, choreographer, and director.

Early life and career
Born in Covington, Kentucky, Reams earned a Master of Arts degree and was awarded an honorary doctorate from the Conservatory of Music at the University of Cincinnati. He made his Broadway debut in Sweet Charity in 1966.

Reams was nominated for both the Tony and Drama Desk Awards as Best Featured Actor in a Musical for his performance in the original production of 42nd Street in 1980. He played the role of Frank Schultz in the 1989 Paper Mill Playhouse production of Show Boat, which was televised on Great Performances by PBS .

Broadway credits
1966: Sweet Charity (Young Spanish Man)
1969: Oklahoma! (Will Parker)
1970: Applause (Duane Fox)
1974: Lorelei (Henry Spofford)
1978: Hello, Dolly! (Cornelius Hackl)
1980: 42nd Street (Billy Lawlor)
1983: La Cage aux Folles (Albin/Zaza)
1994: Beauty and the Beast (Lumiere)
1995: Hello, Dolly! (Choreographer)
1998: An Evening with Jerry Herman (Co-star & Director)
2006: The Producers (Roger DeBris)

Film and television credits
1968: Sweet Charity (Dancer)
1987: Leg Work
1989: Great Performances (Frank Schultz)
2017: Nunsense (The Saint)
2018: Theater Talk (Himself)

References

External links
 

Lee Roy Reams at Internet Off-Broadway Database

American male musical theatre actors
American theatre directors
American choreographers
American male dancers
American male singers
People from Covington, Kentucky
University of Cincinnati – College-Conservatory of Music alumni
1942 births
Living people
Male actors from Kentucky
Singers from Kentucky